Oftebro is a surname. Notable people with the surname include:

Einar Lurås Oftebro (born 1998), Norwegian Nordic combined skier
Jakob Oftebro (born 1986), Norwegian actor
Jens Lurås Oftebro (born 2000), Norwegian Nordic combined skier, brother of Einar
Nils Ole Oftebro (born 1944), Norwegian actor and illustrator